Bedeque and Area is a municipality that holds community status in Prince Edward Island, Canada. It was formed through the amalgamation of the communities of Bedeque and Central Bedeque on November 17, 2014.

Demographics 

See also 
List of communities in Prince Edward Island

References 

Communities in Prince County, Prince Edward Island
Rural municipalities in Prince Edward Island